Castellaroite is a rare arsenate mineral with formula Mn3(AsO4)2•4H2O. It is related to the phosphate mineral metaswitzerite. Castellaroite is monoclinic, with space group P21/n. The other natural manganese arsenate hydrate is manganohörnesite, which is an octahydrate.

References

Arsenate minerals
Manganese(II) minerals
Monoclinic minerals
Minerals in space group 14